Sum Ting Wong, a phonetic double entendre for "something wrong", may refer to:
A gag name used in the Asiana Airlines Flight 214 KTVU prank
Sum Ting Wong (drag queen), a British drag queen